A Treasury is a Nick Drake compilation aimed at the audiophile audience. Released in the UK on 27 September 2004 and in the US on 26 October 2004, it was available as both a hybrid multichannel SACD and a 180 gram vinyl LP. To promote the compilation, a single was issued for the song "River Man", released on CD and 7" vinyl in the UK on 13 September 2004.

Track listing
 "Introduction" – 1:31
 from Bryter Layter, 1971
 "Hazey Jane II" – 3:44
 from Bryter Layter, 1971
 "River Man" – 4:18
 from Five Leaves Left, 1969
 "Cello Song" – 4:45
 from Five Leaves Left, 1969
 "Hazey Jane I" – 4:28
 from Bryter Layter, 1971
 "Pink Moon" – 2:03
 from Pink Moon, 1972
 "Poor Boy" – 6:07
 from Bryter Layter, 1971
 "Magic" – 2:48
 from Made to Love Magic, 2004; originally called "I Was Made to Love Magic" from Time of No Reply, 1986
 "Place to Be" – 2:42
 from Pink Moon, 1972
 "Northern Sky" – 3:45
 from Bryter Layter, 1971
 "Road" – 2:01
 from Pink Moon, 1972
 "Fruit Tree" – 4:48
 from Five Leaves Left, 1969
 "Black Eyed Dog" – 3:25
 from Made to Love Magic, 2004
 "Way to Blue" – 3:10
 from Five Leaves Left, 1969
 "From the Morning" – 2:30
 from Pink Moon, 1972
 "Plasir d'amour" (Hidden bonus track) – 0:46
 recorded during the Pink Moon sessions, 1971; previously unreleased

Certifications

References

Nick Drake compilation albums
2004 compilation albums
Island Records compilation albums